Snafu is the first album by Snafu. The album was issued on the short-lived WWA record label, founded in 1973 by Black Sabbath manager Patrick Meehan and was produced and engineered by Vic Smith.

"Drowning in the Sea of Love" had been released in the United States the previous year as a promo single by Capitol. In 1974 the track "Goodbye USA" was released as a single, b/w "Dixie Queen" (written by Peter Solley), on the Vertigo label in the Netherlands.

Cover art 
The cover art, including photography and the entire gate-fold sleeve inner, is by Roger Dean.

Track listing

Musicians
 Bobby Harrison - lead vocals, percussion
 Micky Moody - guitars, backing vocals, mandolin
 Pete Solley - keyboards, backing vocals
 Colin Gibson - bass
 Terry Popple - drums
(uncredited - fiddle)
(uncredited - backing vocals)

Other personnel
Vic Smith - producer and engineer
Malcom Koss - co-ordinator
Roger Dean - photography and cover design

References

Snafu (band) albums
1973 debut albums
Albums with cover art by Roger Dean (artist)